The 8"/55 caliber gun (spoken "eight-inch-fifty-five-caliber") formed the main battery of United States Navy heavy cruisers and two early aircraft carriers.  United States naval gun terminology indicates the gun barrel had an internal diameter of 8 inches (203 mm), and the barrel was 55 calibers long (barrel length is 8 inch × 55 = 440 inches or 36.6 feet or 11 meters).

Mark 9
These built-up guns weighed about 30 tons including a liner, tube, jacket, and five hoops.  A down-swing Welin breech block was closed by compressed air from the gas ejector system.  Loading with two silk bags each containing   of smokeless powder gave a  projectile a velocity of 2800 feet per second (853 m/s).  Range was 18 miles  at the maximum elevation of 41 degrees.

Mark 12
These simplified built-up guns eliminated hoops to reduce weight to 17 tons. The breech mechanism was similar and loading two silk bags each containing 43 pounds (20 kg) of smokeless powder gave a 335-pound (152 kg) projectile a velocity of 2500 feet per second (760 m/s). Each gun could fire about four rounds per minute.

Mark 14
These guns were similar to Mark 9, with the same shell weight and maximum range, with a smaller chamber and rifling twist decreased from 1 in 35 to 1 in 25 in a chromium-plated bore.

Mark 15
These guns were similar to Mark 12, with the same shell weight and maximum range, with the smaller chamber of the Mark 14 gun.  Useful life expectancy was 715 effective full charges (EFC) per liner.

Mark 16
These self-loading guns with lined monobloc construction and vertical sliding breech blocks weighed about 20 tons.  Semi-fixed ammunition (projectile and powder case handled separately) with 78 pounds (35 kg) of smokeless powder gave a 335-pound (152 kg) projectile a velocity of 2500 feet per second (760 m/s).  Each gun could fire about ten rounds per minute.  Useful life expectancy was 780 EFC per liner.  Range was 17 miles (27 kilometers) at the maximum elevation of 41 degrees.  This gun was modified for the experimental Major Caliber Lightweight Gun.

Coast defense use
The turrets were turned over to the United States Army Coast Artillery Corps and remounted as coastal artillery on Oahu. Four two-turret batteries were established at Salt Lake near Aliamanu Crater (Battery Salt Lake, later Battery Burgess), Wiliwilinui Ridge Military Reservation (Battery Wilridge, later Battery Kirkpatrick), Opaeula Military Reservation (Battery Opaeula, later Battery Riggs), and Brodie Camp Military Reservation (Battery Brodie, later Battery George Ricker). After the war, all of the guns and turrets were scrapped in 1948, along with almost all other US coast artillery.

One of s main battery 8 inch 55 caliber gun turrets (Turret No. 2) damaged in a kamikaze attack on January 5, 1945 was removed and taken to the Nevada Test Site and converted into a rotating radiation detector, to collect data on nuclear tests.

Ships mounting 8"/55 caliber guns

 2  (c. 1921 – 1925) aircraft carriers:
 , 
 Mk 9 guns in four 190-ton twin turrets
 removed in 1942 and added to Oahu coast defenses

 2  (c. 1927) heavy cruisers:
 , 
 Mk 9 (later Mk 14) guns in two 190-ton twin turrets and two 250-ton triple turrets

 6  (c. 1928) heavy cruisers:
 2 of 6: , 
 Mk 9 guns in three 250-ton triple turrets
 Houston was sunk in March 1942, Chicago was sunk in January 1943
 Mk 9 (later Mk 14) guns in three 250-ton triple turrets

 2  (c. 1930) heavy cruisers:
 , 
 Mk 9 (later Mk 14) guns in three 250-ton triple turrets

 7  (c. 1931) heavy cruisers:
 3 of 7: 294 ton triple turrets
 : Mk 9 guns (sunk in 08/1942)
 : Mk 9 (later Mk 14) guns
 : Mk 9 (later Mk 15) guns
 Mk 12 guns in three 250-ton triple turrets

 
 Mk 12 guns in three 314-ton triple turrets

 14  (c. 1941) heavy cruisers:
 1 of 14: 
 Mk 12 guns in three 300-ton triple turrets
 Mk 15 guns in three 300-ton triple turrets

 3  (c. 1944) heavy cruisers:
 Mk 15 guns in three 300-ton triple turrets

 3  (c. 1945) heavy cruisers:
 Mk 16 guns in three 450-ton triple turrets

 1 ex-: 
 Mk 16 gun in one 86-ton single automatic mount 8"/55 caliber Mark 71 gun installation

See also
8"/55 caliber Mark 71 gun 1970s US experimental program

Weapons of comparable role, performance and era
203mm/50 Modèle 1924 gun French equivalent
20.3 cm SK C/34 Naval gun German equivalent
203 mm /53 Italian naval gun Italian equivalent
20 cm/50 3rd Year Type naval gun Japanese equivalent
BL 8 inch Mk VIII naval gun UK equivalent

References

Bibliography
 
 

 "Mystery in the Desert Is a Mystery No More".

External links

World War II naval weapons
Naval guns of the United States
203 mm artillery
Coastal artillery
Military equipment introduced in the 1920s